Nork Marash FC, is a defunct Armenian football club from the capital Yerevan. The club was formed in 2002 and participated in the Armenian First League during the same year. However, the club was dissolved in 2004 after the 26th round of the First League season.

League record

They were deducted by 3 point in the 2004 season.

References

Association football clubs established in 2002
Association football clubs disestablished in 2004
Nork Marash
2002 establishments in Armenia
2004 disestablishments in Armenia